Chen Hongshou (1598–1652), formerly romanized as Ch'en Hung-shou, was a Chinese painter of the late Ming dynasty.

Life

Chen was born in Zhuji, Zhejiang province in 1598, during the Ming dynasty. His courtesy name was Zhanghou (章侯), and his  pseudonyms were Laolian (老莲), Fuchi (弗迟), Yunmenseng (云门僧), Huichi (悔迟), Chiheshang (迟和尚) and Huiseng (悔僧). He once trained under Lan Ying, and was skilled in painting peculiar human figures, landscapes, flower-and-bird. He utilized plump, profound brushwork and precise color, creating a unique style. He always painted illustrations and made tapestry portraits. His two masterpieces, Shui Hu Ye Zi (水浒叶子) and Bo Gu Ye Zi, were the rare examples among the Ming and the Qing dynasties. He was very famous at that time, called "Chen in South and Cui in North", together with Cui Zizhong. He also was skilled in calligraphy, poetry and prose.

Works

His works are kept in museums and galleries all over the world including these in the United States:

Returning Home  Honolulu Museum of Art
Flowers & Bird (Xi Shang Mei Shao)  Metropolitan Museum of Art
Immortals Celebrating a Birthday Indianapolis Museum of Art
Lady Xuanwen Jun Giving Instructions on the Classics  Cleveland Museum of Art
Master Laozi on the Back of Ox  Cleveland Museum of Art
The Mountain of the Five Cataracts  Cleveland Museum of Art
The Dragon King Revering the Buddha  Freer Gallery of Art

Gallery

See also

List of Chinese painters
Chinese painting

Notes

References
 Cihai bianji weiyuanhui (辞海编辑委员会). Cihai (辞海). Shanghai: Shanghai cishu chubanshe (上海辞书出版社), 1979.

External links
Chen Hongshou and his Painting Gallery at China Online Museum

1598 births
1652 deaths
17th-century Chinese painters
Painters from Zhejiang
Ming dynasty painters
People from Zhuji
Chinese portrait painters
Artists from Shaoxing
Buddhist artists